Redford may refer to:

Places

Australia 
 Redford, Queensland, a locality split between the Shire of Murweh and the Maranoa Region

United Kingdom 
 Redford, Angus 
 Redford, Dorset 
 Redford, Edinburgh
 Redford, West Sussex

United States 
 Redford, Michigan; a township
 Redford Union School District
 Old Redford, Detroit, Michigan; a neighborhood
 Redford, Missouri
 Redford, New York
 Redford, Texas

People
 Redford (surname)
 Redford Mulock, CBE, DSO (1886–1961) Canadian Air Commodore
 Redford Pennycook (born 1985), rugby player
 Redford Webster (1761–1833), U.S. apothecary
 Redford White (1955–2010), Filipino actor

Facilities and structures
 Redford Barracks, Redford, Edinburgh, Scotland, UK
 Redford Union High School, Redford, Michigan, USA
 Redford High School, Detroit, Michigan, USA
 Redford Theatre, Detroit, Michigan, USA

Other uses
 Redford cabinet (2011–2014), Alberta government cabinet of Allison Redford

See also 

 Battle of Red Ford (1294) Lorne, Scotland
 Redfield (disambiguation)
 Radford (disambiguation)
 Reford (disambiguation)